Deutsche Schule Albrecht Dürer or Deutsche Schule Sevilla is a German international school in Seville, Andalucia, Spain. As of 2016 there are 58 teachers and 741 students.

It was created in 1921. It serves kindergarten-second year of bachillerato.

References

External links
  Deutsche Schule Sevilla

German international schools in Spain
Schools in Seville
1921 establishments in Spain
Educational institutions established in 1921
International schools in Andalusia